Hennes was a women's magazine published in Sweden. The magazine was in circulation between 1961 and 2009.

History and profile
Hennes was established in 1961. The owner was Egmont Holding AB. The company acquired in 1997. It was headquartered in Malmö, and targeted young women. The last issue of Hennes appeared in May 2009.

See also
List of magazines in Sweden

References

1961 establishments in Sweden
2009 disestablishments in Sweden
Defunct magazines published in Sweden
Magazines disestablished in 2009
Magazines established in 1961
Mass media in Malmö
Swedish-language magazines
Women's magazines published in Sweden